The Black Sea Shipyard is a shipbuilding facility in Mykolaiv, Ukraine, on the southern tip of the of Mykolaiv peninsula. It was founded in 1895 by Belgian interests and began building warships in 1901. At the beginning of World War I in 1914, it was one of the largest industrial facilities in the Russian Empire. The shipyard was moribund in the first decades of the Soviet Union until the Soviets began building up their fleet in the 1930s and it began building surface warships as well as submarines. The yard was badly damaged during World War II and took several years to be rebuilt. Surface warship construction temporarily ended in the mid-1950s before being revived in the mid-1960s and submarines were last built in the yard in late 1950s. The Black Sea Shipyard built all of the aircraft carrying ships of the USSR and Russia and continued before the 2022 Russian invasion of Ukraine to build large commercial ships.

History 
In 1895, the shipyard was established as the Association of Shipyards and Foundry Works (Russian: Obshchestvo sudostroitel'nykh i liteinykh zavodov)––a Belgian-owned company and began building warships in 1901. It was merged with the Black Sea Mechanical and Foundry Works (Russian: Chernomorskii mekhanicheskii i liteinyi zavod) in 1908 and was renamed Associated Nikolaev Shipbuilding, Mechanical and Iron Works (Russian: Nikolaevskoe obshchestvo sudostroitel'nykh, mekhanicheskikh i liteinykh zavodov) in 1908. It came under the control of Share Society Nikolaev Works and Shipyards (Russian: Aktsionernoe obshchstvo Nikolaevskikh zavodov i verfei (ONZiV)) in 1911 and was nicknamed the "Naval Shipyard". Around this time it was supported by the British armaments company of Vickers Limited. By 1914 the shipyard employed some 10,400 workers, which made it one of the largest industrial firms in Russia.

After the war, it was renamed the Black Sea Shipbuilding Works (Russian: Chernomorskii sudostroitel'nyi zavod) when it came under the control of the Bolsheviks. During the 1930s it was renamed in honor of André Marti and became the Marti (South) Yard. On 30 December 1936, the yard was redesignated as Shipyard No. 198 (named for Marti). During these early years, the yard constructed surface warships and Dekabrist-class submarines.

In January 1938, Vyacheslav Molotov, the Chairman of the People’s Commissar Council, declared the following:

It was then the government introduced the 10-year Big Shipbuilding Program. The plan included the construction of battleships and heavy cruisers which would represent the ocean might and strength of the country.

On 19 October 1940, the government decided to terminate battleship and heavy cruiser construction. It was ordered to concentrate all their efforts on small-size and medium-size warship construction. However, the completion of ships of various previously laid down classes continued. On the whole, the Soviet shipbuilding was once again re-directed for submarine and light surface ship construction. Nevertheless, by the 1950s, an estimated 65 Whiskey-class submarines, Sverdlov-class light cruisers,  and the Stalingrad-class battlecruiser were built.

During the 1960s, the Moskva-class helicopter carriers and the Kiev-class VSTOL aircraft carrying cruisers were constructed. The fourth Kiev-class, Admiral Gorshkov, was launched in 1982 and later, in 1985, the first Kuznetsov-class, Admiral Kuznetsov, was launched. The Admiral Kuznetsovs hull design is based on the Admiral Gorshkov but is larger with a full load displacement, 58,500 tons as compared to Admiral Gorshkovs 40,400 tons. KH-11 satellite photographs of the construction of the Admiral Kuznetsov were leaked to Jane's Defence Weekly in 1985 by Samuel Loring Morison, a naval intelligence analyst with the U.S. Navy.

Commercial ships and naval auxiliaries were, and continue to be constructed there. Commercial ships are primarily dry-cargo ships, fish-factory ships, and large trawlers. In the late 1970s, the shipyard constructed two large trawlers for the State Committee of Fisheries of Ukraine.

Facilities and services 

The State joint stock company Chernomorsudoproekt is one of the leading ship design firms in Ukraine. The firm was founded in 1956 around the design personnel of Nikolayev shipbuilding enterprises. The enterprise has built and exported vessels to Sweden, Bulgaria, Norway, Romania, Great Britain, Germany, Portugal, Kuwait, India and Greece.

The shipyard has two main areas covering . The first slipway (No. 0) has end-launch building ways and blocking docks. The second is a horizontal building slip (No. 1) with a covered launch.

The largest slipway (No.0) is capable of constructing tankers, bulk carriers, supply vessels, and roll-on/roll-off ships.

The second slipway (No.1) is a flow-position line, which is located in the sheltered slipway and is actually a closed-loop autonomous production line. Launching of vessels is effected with the help of the floating dock.

The shipyard consists of several workshops to include: the slipway workshop, assembly and welding workshop, plating workshop, and an outfitting workshop.

According to their public website, the shipyard also includes: 

As of 2008 the shipyard is a major enterprise consisting of shipbuilding, machine-building, and metallurgy. The shipyard has its own design center with a qualified engineering staff and modern computer equipment. Their integrated shipbuilding system (FORAN) includes computer-aided design (CAD), engineering (CAE), and manufacturing (CAM) of vessels.

Vessels 

Vessels constructed in this shipyard were numerous. The table below lists many of these vessels to include when they were laid and launched.

Notes: NATO class only shown if applicable; classes of vessels launched before 1949 are provided as originally designated. Most vessel names provided is the name given when launched–some ships may have since been renamed.

See also 
 List of ships of Russia by project number
 List of Soviet and Russian submarine classes
 Admiral Makarov National University of Shipbuilding

Notes

Bibliography

External links 
 Chernomorsky Plant, Federation of American Scientists Website

 
Shipbuilding companies of Ukraine
Shipbuilding companies of the Soviet Union
Shipyards of Ukraine
Ukrainian brands
Buildings and structures in Mykolaiv
Shipbuilding companies of Imperial Russia
Economy of Mykolaiv
Companies based in Mykolaiv
Companies nationalised by the Soviet Union